The 1883 Bruce by-election was a by-election held on 29 June in the  electorate during the 8th New Zealand Parliament.

The by-election was caused by the death on 16 May of the incumbent MP James Rutherford.

On a show of hands Mr Gillies won, but the third candidate William A. Mosley demanded a poll.

The by-election was won by James McDonald.

However in the  Gillies won the seat and McDonald came third.

Results
The following table gives the election result:

References

Bruce 1883
1883 elections in New Zealand
Politics of Otago